Cow Springs may refer to:

 Cow Springs, Arizona, United States, an unincorporated community
 Cow Springs Member, a member of the Entrada Formation in Arizona, United States
 Cow Springs Ranch, a ranch in Luna County, New Mexico, United States
 Cow Springs, an area near Neenach, California, United States